South Norfolk Historic District is a national historic district located at Chesapeake, Virginia. The district encompasses 668 contributing buildings and 1 contributing site in what started as a planned community of Norfolk County, Virginia and grew to become an independent city. South Norfolk was never part of Norfolk, Virginia. In fact, the two cities are separated by the Eastern Branch of the Elizabeth River. South Norfolk is a primarily residential district that was developed between 1890 and 1930. The dwellings include representative examples of the Colonial Revival, Stick Style, and Queen Anne styles. The district also includes several churches, a school, a park, and a small local business district.

It was listed on the National Register of Historic Places in 1989.

References

Historic districts on the National Register of Historic Places in Virginia
Queen Anne architecture in Virginia
Colonial Revival architecture in Virginia
Buildings and structures in Chesapeake, Virginia
National Register of Historic Places in Chesapeake, Virginia